Pete Taylor Park is a baseball stadium located in Hattiesburg, Mississippi, that is home to the Southern Miss Golden Eagles baseball team.

In 2011, Southern Miss announced the expansion of Pete Taylor Park.  The plans include adding 1,358 seats and expanding the seating capacity to 4,300.  The expansion was completed for the start of the 2012 season.

Events
The park hosted the 1990 Metro Conference baseball tournament. and has hosted the Conference USA baseball tournament seven times in 1996, 2005, 2009, 2014, 2015, 2016, and 2022.

Attendance
In 2022, the Golden Eagles ranked 10th among Division I baseball programs in attendance, averaging 4,771 per home game and a cumulative attendance of 133,578. - 2022 Division I Baseball Attendance - Final

Top baseball crowds at Pete Taylor Park

See also
 List of NCAA Division I baseball venues

References

Southern Miss Golden Eagles baseball
College baseball venues in the United States
Baseball venues in Mississippi
Buildings and structures in Hattiesburg, Mississippi
1985 establishments in Mississippi
Sports venues completed in 1985